Blue Rocks (Australian postcode 7255) is a small township on the mid western coast of Flinders Island, Tasmania, Australia.
Blue Rocks Post Office opened around 1936 and closed in 1969.

References

Towns in Tasmania
Flinders Island